Dragan Janković (born 20 February 1992) is a Serbian football striker who plays for Swiss club FC Renens.

References

External links
 
 Dragan Janković stats at utakmica.rs 
 

1992 births
Living people
Sportspeople from Loznica
Serbian footballers
Association football forwards
FK Srem Jakovo players
FK Sinđelić Beograd players
FK Palić players
FK Spartak Subotica players
FK Sloboda Užice players
FK Loznica players
Serbian First League players
Serbian expatriate footballers
Expatriate footballers in Switzerland
Serbian expatriate sportspeople in Switzerland